Narayan Palekar (before 1954-26 July 2006) was an Indian freedom fighter who participated in Goa liberation movement and leader of Communist Party of India. He was the President of Goa state council of the All India Trade Union Congress (AITUC). He was one of the founder members of the Goa Peoples' Party that later became the CPI along with George Vaz and S. A. Dange in Goa.

References

 
Communist Party of India politicians from Goa
2006 deaths
Goa liberation activists